Camp B'nai Brith is a Jewish summer camp north of Montreal, in Sainte-Agathe-des-Monts. Camp B'nai Brith has been recognized as a pioneer in the world of community-service camps in North America. CBB offers camping to children and senior citizens on a sliding fee scale based on the family's finances, with fundraising activities subsidizing those who cannot afford to pay.

History
In 1920, the Mount Royal Lodge of B'nai Brith Canada set out on a project to provide summer holidays for underprivileged Jewish boys. The counsellors and directors were student volunteers from McGill University, and repurposed army tents were used as sleeping quarters. The camp emphasized Jewish culture and Zionism in its activities.

Camp B'nai Brith moved to its current location in 1929. All capital and operating costs were financed by Mount Royal Lodge until 1942, when Camp B'nai Brith became a constituent agency of the Combined Jewish Appeal. From 1954 to 1964, the camp grew to accommodate over 1000 campers, most of whom received scholarships to attend. In the late 1970s, a seniors' vacation retreat was created at the camp in conjunction with the Cummings Golden Age Centre.

CBB now runs a variety of different programs over the course of the summer and runs two main camper sessions of about 425 campers each.

Notable alumni
 Saul Bellow, writer
 William Shatner, actor
 Harley Morenstein, Epic Meal Time
 Saul Rubinek, actor

See also
 Camp B'nai Brith of Ottawa

References

1921 establishments in Quebec
Buildings and structures in Laurentides
Jewish organizations based in Canada
Jewish summer camps in Canada
Jews and Judaism in Montreal
Jews and Judaism in Quebec
Organizations established in 1921
Sainte-Agathe-des-Monts
Summer camps in Canada
Zionism in Canada
B'nai B'rith